Carol Off (born 1954/1955) is a Canadian journalist, commentator, and author associated with CBC Television and CBC Radio.

Early life 
Off was born in Winnipeg, Manitoba, in 1954 or 1955. She moved to Ottawa at ten years old and later moved to London, Ontario. As a child, she kept a diary and enjoyed going to libraries. She dropped out of high school to go traveling and hitchhiked around Canada for 2 years. After returning, she finished high school and married for the first time.

She attended the University of Western Ontario and studied English, which began her career.

Career
She got her start in journalism as a staff writer for The Gazette, the student newspaper at the University of Western Ontario. She graduated with a B.A. degree from Western in 1981.

Off was a host of CBC Radio One's As It Happens from 2006 to 2022. Previously a documentary reporter for The National, where she covered international affairs, Off also hosted the political debate series counterSpin on CBC Newsworld.

She served on the board of directors of Canadian Journalists for Free Expression from 2001 to 2007.

Off has been honoured for her journalism with a Gemini Award (2002), the John Drainie Award for distinguished contributions to Canadian broadcasting (2008), and a Gabriel Award (2016).

Off has also written books on the Canadian military, including The Lion, the Fox, and the Eagle (2000) and The Ghosts of Medak Pocket: the Story of Canada's Secret War (2005).

In 2006, she released Bitter Chocolate, a book about the corruption and human rights abuses associated with the cocoa industry.  She wrote that French-Canadian journalist Guy-André Kieffer, who was kidnapped in Abidjan, Côte d'Ivoire in 2004, had been murdered for exposing Ivorian government corruption in connection with cocoa.

Her latest book, All We Leave Behind: A Reporter's Journey into the Lives of Others (2017) , won the B.C. National Award for Canadian Non-Fiction and the 2018 Ontario Historical Society Huguenot Society of Canada Award.

Off has received honorary degrees from both Western University and the Royal Military College of Canada.

On January 18, 2022, Off announced her retirement from As It Happens on-air, effective February 25. She is expected to continue with the CBC as creator and host of a new weekly series for the network's summer schedule.

Personal life
Off married painter Fred Harrison after she graduated from high school, and her only child, a son named Joel Harrison, was born in 1976. She divorced Harrison and left their son with him when she moved to Toronto after graduating from the University of Western Ontario. Later, Off married fellow CBC broadcaster and former host of The Fifth Estate Linden MacIntyre in 2000.

References

External links
 Carol Off biography at CBC Radio
 Carol Off - On Hosting As It Happens, The Importance of Public Space & Her Beginnings in Journalism at Broadcasting Canada, July 20, 2013

1950s births
Canadian television reporters and correspondents
Canadian radio news anchors
Living people
Canadian women non-fiction writers
Canadian women radio hosts
Canadian talk radio hosts
CBC Radio hosts
Journalists from Manitoba
Journalists from Ontario
University of Western Ontario alumni
Canadian women radio journalists
Canadian women television journalists
Canadian war correspondents
Women military writers
Writers from London, Ontario
Writers from Winnipeg
20th-century Canadian journalists
20th-century Canadian women writers
20th-century Canadian non-fiction writers
21st-century Canadian journalists
21st-century Canadian women writers
21st-century Canadian non-fiction writers
Year of birth missing (living people)